The 2022 Pan American Surf Games, also known as PASA Games 2022, was the fifteenth edition of the Pan American Surf Games the main competition organized by the Pan American Surf Association. It was held at Playa Venao in Pedasí District, Panama from 7 to 13 August 2022.

234 athletes from 17 national teams competes in 8 surfing events; comprising Open (shortboard), Longboard, SUP surf and SUP race each for men and women.

The competition served to seed the surfers and teams in the 2023 Pan American Surf Games, which in turn will serve as qualifier for the 2023 Pan American Games.

Brazil won the competition with a total of 15,195 points and 6 out of the 8 gold medals at stake. The defending champions Peru finished second with 12,017 points and 1 gold medal. Argentina (11,055 points and 1 gold medal) and Mexico (9,285 points) were third and fourth respectively.

Schedule
The games were held over a 7-day period, from 7 to 13 August. The opening ceremony took place on 7 August, with the competitions starting on 8 August.

Participating nations
17 out of the 26 national associations affiliated to Pan American Surf Association entered the competition. Each nation was able to enter a maximun of 20 surfers (10 men and 10 women), with up to 4 surfers per gender in the Open events and up to 2 surfers per gender in each Longboard, SUP surf and SUP race events. The number of surfers per national team (if given) is shown in brackets.

Medal table

Results

Men's events

Women's events

Final ranking per teams
The final ranking per teams was drawn up by adding each surfer's individual points earning in the events in which they competed. Surfers obtained points according to the final position they occupied in each event. In Open, Longboard and SUP surf events, the surfers eliminated before the final occupied a certain position, as follows:

Eliminated in round 1 (Open events): 33th place (3rd place of each heat) and  49th place (4th place of each heat)
Eliminated in round 1 (Longboard and SUP surf) and round 2 (Open): 17th place (3rd place of each heat) and 25th place (4th place of each heat)
Eliminated in quarter-finals: 9th place (3rd place of each heat) and 13th place (4th place of each heat)
Eliminated in semi-finals: 5th place (3rd place of each heat) and 7th place (4th place of each heat)

Non-initiators and non-finishers surfers received zero points. Points awarded according to the position were as follows:

The first place of the final ranking per teams was declared as the champion team of the 2022 Pan American Surf Games.

External links
2022 Pan American Surf Games at PASA website.
Final results summary

References

 
Pan American Surf Games
Pan American Surf Games
Pan American Surf Games
International sports competitions hosted by Panama